The 1932 Campeonato Paulista, organized by the APEA (Associação Paulista de Esportes Atléticos), was the 31st season of São Paulo's top association football league. Palestra Itália won the title for the 4th time. no teams were relegated and the top scorer was Palestra Itália's Romeu with 18 goals.

System
The championship was disputed in a single-round robin system, with the team with the most points winning the title. Originally two rounds would be held, but the championship was interrupted in early July due to the outbreak of the Constitutionalist Revolution, only returning in mid-November, leaving no dates left within the year for a second round.

Championship

Top Scores

References

Campeonato Paulista seasons
Paulista